Alisher Tagirovich Morgenshtern (born Alisher Tagirovich Valeyev; February 17, 1998), known mononymously as Morgenshtern (stylized in all caps), is a Russian rapper, record producer, and songwriter. 

He first gained fame in 2018 as the author of parodies of popular music artists of that time, publishing these videos on his YouTube channel.

Biography
Alisher was born on February 17, 1998, in Ufa; he changed his last name to Morgenshtern (Russian and Bashkir: Моргенштерн) as a teenager. His mother is of Russian-Jewish descent, whilst his father was of Bashkir descent. His mother was a florist; his parents divorced and when Alisher turned 11, his father died of liver cirrhosis due to severe alcoholism.

He has been interested in music since his childhood, and as a teenager he stated that he loved skateboarding.

He released his first music video in 2010. 

He attended university for some time, but shortly after starting he was expelled due to his "frank activities on YouTube", as the rector of the university stated. 

Morgenshtern was also a street musician, and was the head singer of the rock band MMD Crew, with whom he collaborated in a song with the Russian rapper Face.

He's most known for his YouTube-show "#EasyRap".

In April 2021, Morgenstern sent a donation to the fund for helping orphans "Our Children" in Bashkiria. This is reported on the foundation's page in VKontakte. The organization clarified that the musician sent a total of 666,666 rubles, which was the largest donation to the NGO from a private person. This money will be spent on the development of the project "Mentoring".

In May 2022, the Russian Ministry of Justice put Morgenstern on the list of foreign agents after receiving funding by the Israeli media company Yoola Labs and for his remarks about Victory Day. Morgenstern later apologised on his Telegram channel and tried to appeal against the decision to put him on the foreign agents list, but still continues to be on the list as of March 10, 2023.

Music career 
On 17 January 2020 he released the album "", which was recorded in a week on his live stream. The album became the most successful of Morgenshtern's career, gaining a million streams on VK in the first half hour of release and five million streams in eleven hours. In the first two days after the release, the album was listened to on VK more than 21 million times, which is a record for this social network. On 30th January 2020 he visited the Evening Urgant show.

On 5th March 2020 he released the track "" (ru: Малышка), collaborated with the russian musician . On 5 June 2020 he released the track "Pososi". Official music video for this track, currently is the most disliked YouTube video in Russia. On 9 June 2020 he released the track "", collaborated with Eldzhey. On 31 July 2020 he released the track "Ice", which went viral on social network TikTok.

On 3rd November 2020 Morgenshtern as Russia's Most Successful Showman and Artist 2020 was interviewed by Yury Dud. The interview lasted almost three hours.

In July 2021 Spotify named Morgenshtern the most listened artist from Russia.

Shortly thereafter, Morgenshtern went abroad, and all of his previously scheduled concerts in Russia were canceled. On December 10, Morgenshtern released the single "Domoy" about his leaving Russia for the UAE.

Business
In 2020 Morgenshtern announced his plan to open a restaurant in center of Moscow. On 25 June 2020 Alisher Morgenshtern and Eduard Popov, better known as an autoblogger "Janis Grek" and one of the members of the YouTube channel "Team A", registered Private limited company "KAIF". On 26 October 2020 on the ground floor office building on Bolshaya Dmitrovka street opened the Kaif Provenance restaurant. On 26 September 2021 Morgenstern opened Kaif Burger on Nikolskaya Street in Moscow.

In March 2021, Morgenshtern was appointed as the “youth director” of Alfa-Bank. It is assumed that he will be able to attract at least 100 thousand new customers from among his fans.

Discography

Studio albums 

 Do togo kak stal izvesten (2018)
 Ulybnis, durak! (2019)
 Legendarnaya pyl (2020)
 Million Dollar: Happiness (2021)
 Million Dollar: Business (2021)
 Last One (2022)

EP 
 Hate Me (2018)

Singles 
 Kopy na khvoste  (2018)
 Vot tak (2018)
 Otpuskayu (2018)
 Turn it on!  (2019)
 Guerra (2019)
 Novyj merin (2019)
 Igrovoy computer  (2019)
 Mne pokh  (2019)
 Yung Hefner (2019)
 Mne pokh (Acoustic Version)  (2020)
 Malyshka (2020)
 Pososi (2020)
 Cadillac  (2020)
 Cadillac (Remix Pack)   (2020)
 Ice (2020)
 Lollipop  (2020)
 El Problemá  (2020)
 Watafuk?!  (2020)
 Klip za 10 lyamov (2020)
 Cristal & Moyot (2020)
 Degenerat (Deluxe)  (2021)
 Rozovoye vino 2  (2021)
 Family  (2021)
 Novaya volna  (2021)
 Leck  (2021)
 Dulo (2021)
 Cristal & Moyot (Remix)  (2021)
 Show (2021)
 Ya ne znayu  (2021)
 Domoy (2021)
 Pochemu? (2022)
 12 (2022)
 Selyavi (2022)
 Nomer (2022)
 Izvestnym  (2022)
 Daleko  (2022)
 5:00 AM  (2022)
 Skolko stoi lubov  (2022)
 Priton  (2022)
 Bugatti  (2022)
 Ya ubil Marka (Oxxxymiron Diss) (2022)

Awards and honors

Notes

References 

1998 births
Living people
Russian YouTubers
Russian hip hop musicians
Russian rappers
Mumble rappers
Bashkir people
Musicians from Ufa
Russian activists against the 2022 Russian invasion of Ukraine
Russian expatriates in the United Arab Emirates
People listed in Russia as foreign agents
Music YouTubers